Iraj Tahmasb (b. 1959) is an Iranian actor, screenwriter and director of TV series and films. He is best known for co-creating of popular puppet character, Kolah Ghermezi.

Filmography
 Mehmouni (TV series) - 2022
Kolah Ghermezi 97 (TV series) - 2018
Kolah Ghermezi 94 (TV series) - 2015
Kolah Ghermezi 93 (TV series) - 2014
Kolah Ghermezi 92 (TV series) - 2013
Kolah Ghermezi and Bache Naneh - 2012
Kolah Ghermezi 91 (TV series) - 2012
Kolah Ghermezi 90 (TV series) - 2011
Kolah Ghermezi 88 (TV series) - 2009
Zir-e Derakht-e Holou - 2006
The Pastry Girl - 2002
Kolah ghermezi and Sarvenaz - 2002 
Once Upon a Time - 1999
Kolah Ghermezi and Pesar Khaleh - 1994
Days of Waiting - 1987

References

External links

1960 births
Living people
Iranian puppeteers
People from Jahrom
Iranian screenwriters
Iranian film directors
Iranian male film actors
University of Tehran alumni
20th-century Iranian people
21st-century Iranian people
Iranian male television actors
Iranian radio and television presenters